Dead Boss is a British sitcom which was shown on BBC Three in 2012.

Writing
The writers, Sharon Horgan and Holly Walsh met through Jo Caulfield, a stand-up comedian who had a show on Radio 4. Horgan and Walsh both worked on the show, Horgan as an actress, and Walsh as a writer. It was Horgan who thought of writing a sitcom based on someone stuck in prison for a crime they did not commit. She asked Walsh if she wanted to work on it with her and the process from conception to broadcast took over two and a half years.

Regular characters
 Sharon Horgan – as Helen Stephens
 Jennifer Saunders – as Governor Margaret
 Bryony Hannah – as Christine
 Geoffrey McGivern – as Tony
 Tom Goodman-Hill – as Tim
 Lizzie Roper – as Top Dog
 Aisling Bea – as Laura Stephens
 Amanda Lawrence – as Mary
 Edward Hogg – as Henry
 Ricky Champ – as Frank
 Emma Pierson – as Mrs Elaine Bridges
 Barnaby Kay – as Justin
 Susan Calman – as Fatty
 Ashley McGuire – as Slasher
 Claire Prempeh – as Yvonne
 Golda Rosheuvel – as Lennie

Episodes

Series 1

The series ended with many unresolved sub-plots and Helen no nearer to being released. For example, her former fiancé has still not visited her in prison, nor explained his disappearance. We do not know what happened to the winning lottery money, why Helen's boss needed a forged passport, nor who is the owner of the body in the storage locker that we see in the final few minutes of episode 6.

Reception
The series received mixed reviews. It holds a rating of 6.7/10 at the Internet Movie Database. Terry Ramsey of The Daily Telegraph gave the series a rating of 3.5/5 and stating that "at the start, this looked like another trying-hard-to-be-wacky-without-actually-being-very-funny BBC Three comedy, but by halfway through the first episode it got into its stride, with succinct characterisation, sly humour and a winning main character. On top of the humour there’s a murder mystery developing, plus a fine cameo role by Jennifer Saunders as the prison governor. I watched the second instalment that followed, and really enjoyed it. I can’t stop now, and am desperate for another episode." Jack Seale of The Radio Times gave the series a negative review, saying "Popular as it now is, this "everyone except the main character is a loon" approach feels like a way to con us out of the 3D creations that are hard to write but keep us coming back. Dead Boss also has an ongoing story arc – again this is in vogue at the expense of giving each episode a tight, resolved plot. You wonder whether this is really because it works better or because writers have lost the knack of setting two or three stories running and then reining them in again 28 minutes later. The story of who really killed Helen's boss is too silly to be believable, but not silly enough for that to stop mattering. Nothing in Dead Boss feels like it actually exists. If a joke falls flat, it's hard to ignore because there's nothing else there. Of course it's possible to do comedy that doesn't have any truth or soul if the jokes are outlandishly good but, despite a superb cast, Dead Boss struggles to reinvent incompetent lawyers, meat-headed screws and disgusting prison food. Horgan and new writing partner Holly Walsh's gags don't have their own fresh voice: episode two had a creaking crack at wordplay involving the phrase "plan B" and the words "you" and "see"; a scene where Helen's absurdly creepy stalker had been masturbating in his office led exactly where you thought it might. Pulling had heart and guts. Dead Boss feels hollow." A negative review from Sam Wollaston, where she said that "this was pretty lame – and tame – in comparison. I wanted to like it, but couldn't. So I ignored it. Perhaps it needed time to bed in (pah!), and would get into its stride in week two. I told myself I was giving it a chance by deferring judgment, when of course I was really simply bottling it." Ket Watson of the Metro gave a negative review, in which he stated that "Dead Boss was enticing enough with its stellar cast, excellent writing credentials and intriguing premise, but in the event, this début episode was more Dead Loss than anything else." He also said that "Throttled by a cast of supporting characters cobbled together from left over bits of Psychoville and Prisoner Cell Block H, Dead Boss boasted bonkers eccentricity by the slop-out bucketload but none of it felt remotely original", and "At the centre of it all there’s Horgan, working her socks off as the 'normal' one. But she’s fighting a losing battle, because the script is a bit of a stinker – and she co-wrote it. This is hard to admit for a Horgan fan but thus far Dead Boss is a bit of a dead loss."

References

External links

2012 British television series debuts
2012 British television series endings
2010s British crime comedy television series
2010s British prison television series
2010s British sitcoms
BBC prison television shows
BBC television sitcoms
English-language television shows
Television series created by Sharon Horgan